Carl Allen Webster (born February 10, 1990) is an American former professional baseball pitcher who played in Major League Baseball (MLB) for the Boston Red Sox, Arizona Diamondbacks and Chicago Cubs. He has also played for the Samsung Lions of the KBO League.

Professional career

Los Angeles Dodgers
Webster was selected by the Los Angeles Dodgers in the 18th round of the 2008 MLB Draft and began his career with the Gulf Coast Dodgers in 2008. In 2009, he played primarily with the Arizona League Dodgers and in 2010 was with the Great Lakes Loons where he was 12–9 with a 2.88 ERA in 26 appearances (23 starts) and stuck out 114 batters. In 2011, he started nine games for the Rancho Cucamonga Quakes and was 5–2 with a 2.33 ERA before a mid-season promotion to the AA Chattanooga Lookouts. In 2012, he made 22  starts for the Lookouts (and 5 relief appearances) with a 6–8 record and 3.55 ERA.

Boston Red Sox
On August 25, 2012, Webster was traded to the Boston Red Sox along with infielder Iván DeJesús, Jr., first baseman James Loney, and two players to be named later, in exchange for first baseman Adrián González, pitcher Josh Beckett, outfielder Carl Crawford, infielder Nick Punto, and $11 million. Eventually, pitcher Rubby De La Rosa and OF/1B Jerry Sands were the two players to complete the trade.

Entering 2013, Webster was ranked as the fourth-best prospect in the Red Sox minor league system and ranked 71st in the MLB.com Top 100 Prospects list. The Red Sox added him to their 40-man roster and assigned him to the AAA Pawtucket Red Sox to start the season.

The Red Sox called him up to the Majors for the first time on April 21, 2013 to start the second game of a doubleheader. Webster was optioned the next day. Webster was recalled May 7 after reliever Joel Hanrahan went on the disabled list. Webster was optioned back to Pawtucket on May 9, and recalled on June 22. During his time in the Majors of the 2013 season, Webster made 8 appearances (7 starts) going 1–2 with an 8.60 ERA.

Arizona Diamondbacks
On December 12, 2014, the Red Sox traded Webster, Rubby De La Rosa, and Raymel Flores to the Arizona Diamondbacks in exchange for Wade Miley. The 2015 season proved to be a difficult one for Webster. He was reported to have had shoulder fatigue in April. After struggling to the tune of an 8.18 ERA in AAA, Webster was called up to Arizona and made 5 starts while also appearing out of the bullpen four times.  The Diamondbacks designated Webster for assignment after the season.

Samsung Lions
On November 25, 2015, Webster was traded to the Pittsburgh Pirates in exchange for cash considerations. He was released by the Pirates on December 16 and shortly afterwards signed a one-year contract with the Samsung Lions of the Korea Baseball Organization. He managed to start 12 games for the Lions, pitching to a 5.70 ERA.

Texas Rangers
On November 17, 2016, the Texas Rangers signed Webster to a minor league deal. He elected free agency on November 6, 2017.

Chicago Cubs
On March 2, 2018, Webster signed a minor league contract with the Chicago Cubs. Across three levels in Chicago's minor league system, Webster pitched to a 2.65 ERA in 17 games, and was called up to the Major Leagues on September 19 pitching in three games. He was non-tendered and became a free agent on November 30, 2018. On December 19, he re-signed to a minor league deal with the Cubs.
With the Cubs struggling at the start of the 2019 season Webster was called up to the majors to bolster the bullpen. In his first relief appearance for the Cubs on April 6, the first batter he faced, Milwaukee's Ryan Braun, hit a three-run homer. On May 11, Webster was put on the 10-day disabled list and later moved to the 60-day list. On July 3, he began rehabilitation assignments with the Cubs' rookie league team continuing on July 9th with the Tennessee Smokies (AA). He became a free agent following the 2019 season.

Washington Nationals
On March 9, 2020, Webster signed a minor league deal with the Washington Nationals. He was assigned to the Nationals' Double-A affiliate, the Harrisburg Senators.  The Senators' 2020 schedule was canceled, along with that of every other Minor League Baseball team because of the COVID-19 pandemic, and Webster was released on May 31, 2020.

References

External links

 

1990 births
Living people
People from Greensboro, North Carolina
Baseball players from North Carolina
American expatriate baseball players in South Korea
Major League Baseball pitchers
Boston Red Sox players
Arizona Diamondbacks players
Samsung Lions players
Chicago Cubs players
Gulf Coast Dodgers players
Arizona League Dodgers players
Ogden Raptors players
Great Lakes Loons players
Rancho Cucamonga Quakes players
Chattanooga Lookouts players
Leones del Escogido players
American expatriate baseball players in the Dominican Republic
Portland Sea Dogs players
Pawtucket Red Sox players
Reno Aces players
Round Rock Express players
Arizona League Cubs players
Tennessee Smokies players
Iowa Cubs players